Malcolm M. Prine (August 12, 1928 – September 6, 2011) served as President of the Pittsburgh Pirates from 1985 to 1987.  He was also served as the president and CEO of Ryan Homes.

References

External links
 

1928 births
2011 deaths
American chief executives
Major League Baseball executives
Major League Baseball team presidents
Pittsburgh Pirates executives